Sarah Green "Sallie" Jones Atkinson  (October 14, 1860 – November 14, 1943) was an American educator.

Atkinson was a native of Dinwiddie County, Virginia, and was born into a family of educators. She and her husband, John Pryor Atkinson, donated land and timber for the construction of a high school in Dinwiddie County in 1911. The school, Sunnyside High School, went on to become the first eight-month rural school to gain accreditation in Virginia. As an educator Atkinson was also known for her support of the local 4-H Club and its students.  She was also involved in the fight for women's suffrage in Virginia, serving on a state committee under Governor Andrew Jackson Montague which worked to convince him to allow women the right to vote.

Atkinson died in Dinwiddie County, and was interred in the graveyard of Concord Presbyterian Church in Rawlings, in neighboring Brunswick County. Her name on the marker is given as "Sally".

Atkinson was honored in 1986 by the erection of a historical marker by the Virginia Department of Conservation and Historic Resources; it is located in Dinwiddie County, near the town of McKenney.

References

1860 births
1943 deaths
Educators from Virginia
People from Dinwiddie County, Virginia
19th-century American educators
20th-century American educators
American suffragists
Activists from Virginia
19th-century American women educators
20th-century American women educators